The 2022 Jeddah FIA Formula 2 round was a motor racing event held between 25 and 27 March 2022 at the Jeddah Corniche Circuit. It was the second round of the 2022 FIA Formula 2 Championship and was held in support of the 2022 Saudi Arabian Grand Prix.

Classification

Qualifying 
The qualifying session was held on 25 March 2022. Felipe Drugovich took pole position, the second of his Formula 2 career. The qualifying session was marred by three red flags. The first red flag came out for Théo Pourchaire, whose car broke down. A second red flag was flown after Logan Sargeant crashed heavily at the exit of turn 17. Oddly, a third red flag was shown due to a technical error after GPS systems indicated that Frederik Vesti stopped on track, despite no such event occurring. In addition, Cem Bölükbaşı crashed in practice and was taken to hospital for precautionary checks, and as a result missed qualifying. He was later withdrawn from the event.

Jack Doohan was later disqualified from the final classification for failing to provide the minimum 0.8 kg fuel sample. Jüri Vips, Olli Caldwell, and Frederik Vesti each received three-place grid penalties for impeding. Clément Novalak received a five-place grid penalty for what the race stewards deemed to be a "dangerous case of impeding." Amaury Cordeel received a ten-place grid penalty for failing to slow for the red flag and double waved yellow flags.

Notes:
 – Jüri Vips, Olli Caldwell, and Frederik Vesti received three-place grid penalties for impeding another driver during qualifying. Each driver had one penalty point added to their license.
 – Clément Novalak received a five-place grid penalty for what was deemed a dangerous case of impeding another driver. Novalak had three penalty points added to his license.
 – Amaury Cordeel received a ten-place grid penalty for failing to respect red and double waved yellow flags. Cordeel had four penalty points added to his license.
 – Jack Doohan was disqualified for failing to supply an adequate fuel sample after qualifying. He was given permission to race by the stewards.

Sprint Race 

Notes:
 – Ralph Boschung originally finished eighth, but was given a 20-second time penalty after it was found that he was in front of his starting grid position before the lights went out. Two penalty points were added to his license.
 – Jake Hughes originally finished third, but was later disqualified due to a technical non-conformity. The skid plank on his car was found to have a maximum thickness of 3.6mm, which did not meet the required thickness of 5mm +/-1mm.

Feature Race 

Notes:
 – Amaury Cordeel could not start the Feature Race due to car damage sustained in the Sprint Race.

Standings after the event 

Drivers' Championship standings

Teams' Championship standings

 Note: Only the top five positions are included for both sets of standings.

See also 
 2022 Saudi Arabian Grand Prix

References

External links 
 Official website

|- style="text-align:center"
|width="35%"|Previous race:
|width="30%"|FIA Formula 2 Championship2022 season
|width="40%"|Next race:

Jeddah
2022 in Saudi Arabian sport
Jeddah Formula 2